The Monticello Motor Club is a private country club for automotive enthusiasts with a  long motor racing circuit situated in Monticello, New York. It opened on July 27, 2008, and was built on the site of the former Monticello Airport. In May 2010, Ari Straus, the President of the circuit, submitted a bid to host a Formula One race for a ten-year deal, beginning in 2012; But although the deal length was kept, the event was subsequently awarded to Circuit of the Americas near Austin, Texas instead.

See also
 Bilster Berg, a private race resort in Germany
 Circuito Ascari, a similar private race resort in Spain

References

External links
 Home Page
 Pro Shop Online
 Aurora Straus - professional race driver, and daughter of Ari Straus. Female role model for children and young adults.

Motorsport venues in New York (state)
Sports venues in Sullivan County, New York
2008 establishments in New York (state)
Sports venues completed in 2008
Road courses in the United States